Mojca Rode (born 6 June 1983) is a Slovenian rhythmic gymnast. She is a five-time (2003, 2004, 2007–2009) Slovenian National All-Around champion.

Career
She was a part of Slovenian senior group which competed at the 1999 European Championships in Budapest and placed 8th in 10 Clubs final. They finished on 16th place in Group All-around at the 1999 World Championships in Osaka, Japan.

In 2000, she started competing as individual gymnast again. She and her teammates Dušica Jeremič and Tina Čas placed 13th in Team competition at the 2001 World Championships in Madrid, Spain. She also qualified to Individual All-around Final, where she ended on 20th place, behind Eleni Andriola from Greece. She also competed at the 2001 World Games in Akita where she finished on 8th place in Hoop Final. She won silver medal in All-around at the 2001 Slovenian National Championships behind Dušica Jeremič.

In 2003, she won gold medal in All-around and all Apparatus finals at Slovenian National Championships. She competed at the 2003 Summer Universiade in Daegu, South Korea and qualified to Clubs final, where she finished on 6th place. Mojca then competed at the 2003 World Championships in Budapest, where she finished her season.

After retirement in 2009, she made a come back in 2013, competing at the 2013 World Championships in Kyiv and finishing on 59th place in All-around Qualifications.

Personal life
She is in a relationship with Slovenian gymnast Mitja Petkovšek, with whom she has two daughters, Gaja and Asja.

References

External links
Mojca Rode - FIG Profile

1983 births
Living people
Slovenian rhythmic gymnasts
Sportspeople from Ljubljana